Methacrylamide is the organic compound with the formula CH2=C(CH3)C(O)NH2.  A colorless or white solid, it is a monomer for the production of polymers and copolymers, some of which are used in hydrogels. Methacrylamide is also a  precursor of methyl methacrylate.

References

Acrylamides
Monomers